The 1943 Harvard Crimson football team was an American football team that represented Harvard University during the 1943 college football season. In its first season under head coach Henry Lamar, the team compiled a 2–2–1 record and was outscored 39-34 by opponents. Lloyd M. Anderson was the team captain.

For 1943, and again in 1944, rather than scheduling its usual mix of Ivy League opponents and national college football powerhouses, Harvard played a shorter schedule of smaller New England colleges and military teams. Its football record book describes these two World War II-era seasons as "informal".

Harvard played its home games at Harvard Stadium in the Allston neighborhood of Boston, Massachusetts.

Schedule

References

Harvard
Harvard Crimson football seasons
Harvard Crimson football
1940s in Boston